Fan Lina is a Chinese sprint canoer who competed in the early 2000s. She won a silver medal in the K-4 1000 m event at the 2002 ICF Canoe Sprint World Championships in Seville.

References

Chinese female canoeists
Living people
Year of birth missing (living people)
Asian Games medalists in canoeing
ICF Canoe Sprint World Championships medalists in kayak
Canoeists at the 2002 Asian Games
Medalists at the 2002 Asian Games
Asian Games silver medalists for China